Jaime Julio Lo Presti Travanic (born 27 January 1974) is a former Chilean football defender.

Club career
In 1992 Jaime started his professional career for Universidad Católica at the age of 17. His pro debut was against Argentinian club Independiente de Avellaneda in August 1992. In 1994, Jaime was loaned to Coquimbo Unido where he scored 3 goals playing in the right back position. Coquimbo Unido renewed his contract for the following 1995 season. In 1996, Jaime signed with Unión Española and also renewed for the 1997 season. From 1998 to 1999 Jaime travelled up to northern Chile to play for Deportes Iquique where he managed to be named top defender and scored 5 goals. His speed and strength caught the interest with the well known Colo-Colo where he spent 3 seasons from 2000 to 2003. In 2004 Jaime once again signed for Union Española and later that same year travelled to his native Canada to join the newly formed Edmonton Aviators of the USL A-League scoring two goals.

International career
In 1995 Jaime first caught the eye of the Chile men's national coach Xabier Azkargorta. That same year Jaime made his first appearance in the Chilean men's team against Canada. In 2003, Lo Presti was called again by the Chilean coach Juvenal Olmos to a training session.

References

External links

Jaime Lo Presti at PlayMakerStats
Jaime Lo Presti at National Football Team

1974 births
Living people
Soccer players from Vancouver
Chilean footballers
Chilean expatriate footballers
Chile international footballers
Canadian people of Chilean descent
Canadian people of Croatian descent
Chilean people of Canadian descent
Chilean people of Croatian descent
Citizens of Chile through descent
Naturalized citizens of Chile
Club Deportivo Universidad Católica footballers
Coquimbo Unido footballers
Unión Española footballers
Deportes Iquique footballers
Colo-Colo footballers
Edmonton Aviators / F.C. players
Association football defenders
Chilean Primera División players
USL First Division players
Chilean expatriate sportspeople in Canada 
Expatriate soccer players in Canada